Roots, Branches & Dances is an album by pianist Ronnie Mathews which was recorded in 1978 and released on the Bee Hive label.

Reception

The AllMusic review by Scott Yanow stated, "The music is essentially advanced hard bop with a few surprises tossed in. An intriguing set".

Track listing

Personnel
Ronnie Mathews – piano
Frank Foster – soprano saxophone, tenor saxophone
Ray Drummond – bass
Al Foster – drums
Azzedin Weston – congas, percussion

References

Ronnie Mathews albums
1979 albums
Bee Hive Records albums